The first Slovak orthography was proposed by Anton Bernolák  (1762–1813) in his Dissertatio philologico-critica de litteris Slavorum, used in the  six-volume Slovak-Czech-Latin-German-Hungarian Dictionary (1825–1927) and used primarily by Slovak Catholics.

The standard orthography of the Slovak language is immediately based on the standard developed by Ľudovít Štúr in 1844 and reformed by Martin Hattala in 1851 with the agreement of Štúr. The then-current (1840s) form of the central Slovak dialect was chosen as the standard. It uses the Latin script with small modifications that include the four diacritics (ˇ(mäkčeň), ´(acute accent), ¨(diaeresis/umlaut), ˆ(circumflex)) placed on certain letters. After Hattala's reform, the standardized orthography remained mostly unchanged.

Alphabet
The Slovak alphabet is an extension of the Latin alphabet used for writing the Slovak language.

It has 46 letters which makes it the longest Slavic and European alphabet.

The 46 letters of the Slovak alphabet are:

Some of the vowels might affect the pronunciation of a few consonants, specifically the vowels E, I, and their long pronunciation counterparts. The letters E, É, I, and Í trigger the palatal realization of the preceding D, N, T (with few exceptions when the letters denote the ordinary alveolar consonants, which is their usual phonetic value), so that they are spelled without the háček in this position.

The following digraphs are not considered to be a part of the Slovak alphabet:
 , which stands for the rising-opening diphthong , similar to the  sequence in English (as in yap ), rather than the common  realization of the underlying  in the German word Wirt  'host', which is falling;
 , which stands for the rising-opening diphthong , similar to the  sequence in English (as in yes );
 , which stands for the rising-backing diphthong , similar to the  sequence in English (as in use ) (but with a short ending point), never as a falling-backing diphthong as in some Welsh English new .

In loanwords, all three can stand for the disyllabic sequences , rather than the rising diphthongs.

Sound–spelling correspondences
The primary principle of Slovak spelling is the phonemic principle. The secondary principle is the morphological principle: forms derived from the same stem are written in the same way even if they are pronounced differently. An example of this principle is the assimilation rule (see below). The tertiary principle is the etymological principle, which can be seen in the use of i after certain consonants and of y after other consonants, although both i and y are pronounced the same way.

Finally, the rarely applied grammatical principle is present when, for example, the basic singular form and plural form of masculine adjectives are written differently with no difference in pronunciation (e.g. pekný = nice – singular versus pekní = nice – plural).

Most foreign words receive Slovak spelling immediately or after some time. For example, "weekend" is spelled víkend , "software" - softvér , "gay" - gej  (both not exclusively), and "quality" is spelled kvalita (possibly from Italian qualità). Personal and geographical names from other languages using Latin alphabets keep their original spelling unless a fully Slovak form of the name exists (e.g. Londýn  for "London").

These combinations are usually pronounced as if a háček were found above the consonant. Thus, uniquely among the alveolo-palatal consonants, the alveolo-palatal lateral  is only ever spelled with the dedicated letter ľ. Some exceptions are as follows:
foreign words (e.g. telefón is pronounced )
the following words: ten  'that', jeden  'one', vtedy  'then', teraz  'now'
nominative masculine plural endings of pronouns and adjectives do not turn the preceding d, n, t into palatal consonants (e.g. tí odvážni mladí muži , the/those brave young men)
in adjectival endings, both the long é and the short e (shortened by the rhythmical rule) do not make the preceding d, n, t palatal, so that both zelené stromy  'green trees' and krásne stromy  'beautiful trees' feature the alveolar , rather than the alveolo-palatal .
However, the adjective krásne  (meaning 'beautifully') does feature the alveolo-palatal , resulting in a heterophonic homograph with krásne  'beautiful' (inflected), which features the same alveolar  as the uninflected form krásny , which has an unambiguous spelling. There are some more examples of heterophonic homographs like this. The same difference can be found in Polish; 'beautifully' translates to pięknie , whereas the corresponding inflected form of 'beautiful' is piękne  (with the same dental nasal as in the uninflected form piękny ). There, the difference is reflected in the orthography.

When a voiced obstruent (b, d, ď, dz, dž, g, h, z, ž) is at the end of the word before a pause, it is pronounced as its voiceless counterpart (p, t, ť, c, č, k, ch, s, š, respectively). For example, pohyb is pronounced  and prípad is pronounced .

When "v" is at the end of the syllable, it is pronounced as labio-velar .

The feminine singular instrumental suffix -ou is also pronounced , as if it were spelled -ov.

Consonant clusters containing both voiced and voiceless elements are entirely voiced if the last consonant is voiced, or entirely voiceless if the last consonant is voiceless. For example, otázka is pronounced  and vzchopiť sa is pronounced . This rule applies also over the word boundary. One example is as follows: prísť domov  (to come home) and viac jahôd  (more strawberries).

One of the most important changes in Slovak orthography in the 20th century was in 1953 when s began to be written as z where pronounced  in prefixes (e.g. smluva into zmluva  as well as sväz into zväz ). The phonemic principle has been given priority over the etymological principle in this case.

Rhythmical rule
The rhythmical rule, also known as the rule of "rhythmical shortening", states that a long syllable (that is, a syllable containing á, é, í, ý, ó, ú, ŕ, ĺ, ia, iu, ô) cannot be followed by another long one within the same word. If two long syllables were to occur next to each other, the second one is to be made short. This rule has morphonemic implications for declension (e.g. žen-ám  but tráv-am ) and conjugation (e.g. nos-ím  but súd-im). Several exceptions of this rule exist. It is typical of the literary Slovak language, and does not appear in Czech or in some Slovak dialects.

Diacritics
The acute mark (in Slovak "dĺžeň", "prolongation mark" or "lengthener") indicates length (e.g. í = ). This mark may appear on any vowel except "ä" (wide "e", široké "e" in Slovak). It may also appear above the consonants "l" and "r", indicating the long syllabic  and  sounds.

The circumflex ("vokáň") exists only above the letter "o". It turns the o into a diphthong (see above).

The umlaut ("prehláska", "dve bodky" = two dots) is only used above the letter "a". It indicates an opening diphthong , similar to German Herz  'heart' (when it is not pronounced , with a consonantal ).

The háček (in Slovak "mäkčeň", "palatalization mark" or "softener") indicates a change of alveolar fricatives, affricates, and plosives into either retroflex or palatal consonants, in informal Slovak linguistics often called just "palatalization". Eight consonants can bear a háček. Not all "normal" consonants have a counterpart with háček:
In printed texts, the háček is printed in two forms: (1) č, dž, š, ž, ň and (2) ľ, ď, ť  (looking more like an apostrophe), but this is just a convention. In handwritten texts, it always appears in the first form.
Phonetically, two forms of "palatalization" exist: ľ, ň, ď, ť are palatal, while č, dž, š, ž are retroflex (which, phonetically speaking, is not "soft" but "hard").

Computer encoding
The Slovak alphabet is available within the ISO/IEC 8859-2 “Latin-2” encoding, which generally supports Eastern European languages. All vowels, but none of the specific consonants (that is, no č, ď, ľ, ĺ, ň, ŕ, š, ť, ž) are available within the “Latin-1” encoding, which generally supports only Western European languages.

See also
Slovak phonology
Czech orthography
Slovene alphabet
Orthographia bohemica

References

Slovak language
Indo-European Latin-script orthographies